Danny Boy is a biographical drama film directed by Sam Miller. It details parts of the life of war veteran Brian Wood.

The film tells the story of Brian Wood, a medal-winning war veteran who was accused of war crimes in Iraq during the Battle of Danny Boy by the Iraq Historic Allegations Team, and follows his fight for the truth during the Al-Sweady Inquiry. The film stars Anthony Boyle as Brian Wood, Toby Jones as human rights lawyer Phil Shiner, Alex Ferns as Gavin, Brian's father, and Leah McNamara as Brian's wife.

Danny Boy  was first broadcast on BBC Two on 12 May 2021.

References

External links
 

British historical films
Films directed by Sam Miller